Rajagiriya is part of the Sri Lanka's administrative capital of Sri Jayawardenapura. A fairly large suburb bordering Colombo, Rajagiriya lies between Borella and Ethul Kotte, straddling Parliament Road.

History
The area was originally known as Welikada and stretched from the Ethul Kotte bridge to the tram terminus at Borella. The Welikada Prison was originally within the village limits.

The name Rajagiriya came from the former governor's residence, the grounds of which extended from Madinnagoda Road in the north to the Cotta road in the south. The house and grounds were later purchased by Ananda Coomaraswamy. According to historian Douglas Ranasinghe, a Malayali servant of Coomaraswamy's saw a large mongoose in the garden and shouted 'Raja kiriya' (meaning 'large mongoose') and the name stuck.

There is another viewpoint about the origin of the name. Since Kotte kingdom was the main kingdom during 1412-1597, Rajagiriya area took a major place in Kingdom's security. In Sinhala Language, the word Rajagiriya is made of the combination of words 'Raja'+'Giriya'.'Raja'(රාජ) means 'King' and 'Giriya'(ගිරිය) means 'Neck' or 'Rock'.  The castle was not that much far from Rajagiriya. Since there are no significant mountains or rocks and the area is almost a plain, it believes not to be meant with that Rock meaning. In the Sinhala language, neck is used to distinguish not only the physical part of the body, but also some very important thing. So those elder people who live in this area believes, 'Rajagiriya' word was made because of its importance in the Kingdom of Kotte.

The house was later purchased by Anagarika Dharmapala. The Hewavitharana Textile Training School was built within the grounds and later Hewavitharana Maha Vidyalaya. The house and the truncated lands were later acquired by the Obeyesekere family and it is generally known as the 'Obeyesekere Walauwa'.

The area developed because of plumbago, which was shipped up the canal network from Ingiriya in the Kalutara district for purification at the Welikada graphite works.

The area around the Ethul Kotte bridge became a light industrial area, with the electroplastics and 'Pinnacle' factories and the Ceylon Transport Board's ticket machine workshops.

Several historic buildings in the area have been destroyed. These include the ancient Ambalama (rest house) and the 'Welikada Hotel and Bakery' at the Welikada junction, The 'Shermila' cinema (originally the  Kotte urban development council's first market) and several old houses.

Many of the area's marshes, which were the habitat of birds within the Sri Jayawardenapura Kotte Bird Sanctuary, and which were designated as flood-retention areas, were filled up and built on in spite of the protests of the residents.

In the late 1970s the government of JR Jayawardene ran a major road through the very middle of the EW Perera Park (which commemorated a national hero and was the venue for Football, Cricket and other sports).

Areas in Rajagiriya
The Sri Jayawardenapura Kotte municipal ward of Rajagiriya is confined to the areas around the original grounds of the Governor's house.

The Rajagiriya postal area (also known as the Welikada postal area) also includes Kotiyagoda and Kalapaluwawa within the Kaduwela Pradeshiya Sabha council limits.

Rajagiriya within the Kotte municipal limits comprises:
 Ward no. 1 - Rajagiriya (includes Rajagiriya proper - the area around the Governor's house - Obeyesekerepura, Moragasmulla and Madinnagoda road, bounded by the Kolonnawa Ela canal on the north, the Heen Ela canal on the west, the Cotta Road on the south and the Welikada ward on the east);
 Ward no. 2 - Welikada (includes Welikada proper, and stretches from the Welikada junction to the Ethul Kotte junction, bounded by the Kolonnawa Ela canal on the north and east, Ward 1 on the west, and the Cotta Road on the south).
 Ward no. 3 - Welikada-Nawala (includes Bandaranaikepura and Royal Gardens, the Municipal offices and the western half of Nawala and of Koswatte, bounded by the Cotta Road on the north, the Heen Ela canal on the west, the Diyawanna Oya canal on the south and the Nawala Road on the east).
 Ward no. 4 - Nawala (includes Welikadawatte, eastern Koswatte and Nawala, bounded by the Cotta Road on the north, the Nawala Road on the west and the Diyawanna Oya canal on the south and east).

Important locationsRajagiriya, the old governor's mansion (formerly the Obeyesekere Walauwa)
E. W. Perera Children's Park (what remains of the old park and football ground) on Nawala Road
Sri Jayawardanapura Kotte Municipal Council building on Nawala Road
The Kachcheri
Head-office of the Election Commission
Official Languages Department 
Special Task Force camp
HSBC Electronic Data Processing Group Service Centre
Head-office of the Lanka Orix Leasing Company
Hewavitharana Textile Training School on Dharmapala Mawatha
President's College
The mosque on Nawala Road
The Anglican Church of St Stephen (the gal-palliya'' or stone church) at Moragasmulla
The Roman Catholic Sacred Heart Church
Head-office of Prima Ceylon
Head-office of Perera And Sons Bakers

See also
 Rajagiriya Flyover
Royal Park Murder

References

Populated places in Western Province, Sri Lanka